Grosso or Del Grosso is an Italian surname:
David Grosso (born 1971), Washington D.C. politician
Don Grosso (1915–1985), Canadian ice hockey player
Fabio Grosso (born 1977), Italian footballer
Jeff Grosso (1968–2020), American skateboarder and skateboarding documentarian
Mondo Grosso (born 1967), stage name of Shinichi Osawa, Japanese musician
Ramón Grosso (1943–2002), Spanish footballer
Sonny Grosso (1930–2020), American police detective and film/television producer
Alessandro Del Grosso (born 1972), Italian footballer 
Cristiano Del Grosso (born 1983), Italian footballer
Federico Del Grosso (born 1983), Italian footballer
Julia Grosso (born 2000), Canadian soccer player

See also
Grosso (disambiguation)
Mato Grosso
Concerto grosso

Italian-language surnames